The necropolis of Sas Concas is a prehistoric archaeological site located in the municipality of Oniferi, in the province of Nuoro, Sardinia.

The complex is composed of twenty domus de janas dug into the trachyte and dated to the third millennium BC (Abealzu-Filigosa culture). One of its main features are the petroglyphs depicting the "upside down", a stylized human figure upside down, engraved in two domus de janas.

The site has been the subject of excavations in the 1960s and the 1970s.

External links
 SardegnaCultura, Necropoli di Sas Concas
 Il portale Sardo, Domus de janas de Sas Concas

Archaeological sites in Sardinia